The Wrights were a one-off Australian rock supergroup consisting of Nic Cester (of Jet), Bernard Fanning (of Powderfinger), Phil Jamieson (of Grinspoon), Kram (of Spiderbait), Chris Cheney (of The Living End), Davey Lane (of You Am I and The Pictures), and Pat Bourke (of Dallas Crane). They are named after former Easybeats frontman Stevie Wright, the original performer of the song-trilogy "Evie", which was the group's feature song.

Background
Their first and only single was a cover version of Stevie Wright's song "Evie", an 11-minute song consisting of three parts. "Evie (Pt 1)" was first performed at the Australian Recording Industry Association (ARIA) awards in 2004. They performed the whole trilogy live for the first time at the Sydney Cricket Ground as part of WaveAid, and it was released as a single in February 2005. "Evie (Pt 1)" featured Nic Cester as the vocalist, while Pts 2 and 3 featured vocalists Bernard Fanning of Powderfinger and Phil Jamieson of Grinspoon. The profits for the single were donated to Stevie Wright and the Salvation Army to improve drug and alcohol rehabilitation, as well as the International Red Cross and Red Crescent Movement for the 2004 Boxing Day tsunami.

The three-part single by The Wrights, "Evie Pts 1, 2 and 3", is available on the double-CD album Easy Fever: A Tribute to the Music of the Easybeats and Stevie Wright. (Sony BMG, 2008)

The original single debuted at No. 2 on the Australian ARIA Singles Chart in the week of 2005-03-07.

Reunion
The Wrights made a one-off reunion at "Roosistence", a concert organised by Australian musician Tim Rogers (of You Am I) in a bid to avoid the relocation of the North Melbourne Football Club, an Australian rules football club, which was under pressure from the Australian Football League (AFL) to move to the Gold Coast in Queensland at the time. They played Rose Tattoo's famous song "We Can't be Beaten" (from their album Scarred for Life) alongside other Australian acts including You Am I, Tex Perkins, Something for Kate, Mick Thomas and Rob Clarkson.

In August 2005 the Wrights provided their rendition of "(Let's All) Turn On" for Stoneage Cameos, a tribute album for Hoodoo Gurus, with individual tracks from that group's debut album, Stoneage Romeos (March 1984), covered by fellow Australian artists.

Discography

Personnel

"Evie" Part 1 – "Let Your Hair Hang Down"
Nic Cester (Jet) – vocals
Chris Cheney (The Living End) – lead guitar
Davey Lane (You Am I) – rhythm guitar
Kram (Spiderbait) – drums
Pat Bourke (Dallas Crane) – bass
Daniel Vandenberg – piano

"Evie" Part 2 – "Evie"
Bernard Fanning (Powderfinger) – vocals
Warren "Pig" Morgan (Chain, Billy Thorpe and the Aztecs) – piano
Harry Vanda (The Easybeats) – string arrangement

"Evie" Part 3 – "I'm Losing You"
Phil Jamieson (Grinspoon) – vocals
Davey Lane (You Am I) – lead guitar
Chris Cheney (The Living End) – rhythm guitar
Pat Bourke (Dallas Crane) – bass
Dan Knight – Hammond organ
Kram (Spiderbait) – drums

Backing vocals
Chris Cester (Jet)
Kram (Spiderbait)
Harry Vanda (The Easybeats)
Louise Anton
Chris Cheney (The Living End)

Production
Produced by Harry Vanda and Glenn Goldsmith
Mixed by Daniel Vandenberg

References

External links
Information on The Wrights

Australian rock music groups
Australian supergroups
Musical groups established in 2004
Rock music supergroups